Ferritic stainless steel forms one of the five stainless steel families, the other four being austenitic, martensitic, duplex stainless steels, and precipitation hardened. For example, many of AISI 400-series of stainless steels are ferritic steels. By comparison with austenitic types, these are less hardenable by cold working, less weldable, and should not be used at cryogenic temperatures. Some types, like the 430, have excellent corrosion resistance and are very heat tolerant.

History 
Canadian-born engineer Frederick Mark Becket (1875-1942) at Union Carbide industrialised ferritic stainless steel around 1912, on the basis of "using silicon instead of carbon as a reducing agent in metal production, thus making low-carbon ferroalloys and certain steels practical". He discovered a ferrous alloy with 25-27% Chromium that "was the first of the high-chromium alloys that became known as heat-resisting stainless steel."

Ferritic stainless steels were discovered early but it was only in the 1980s that the conditions were met for their growth:
 It was possible to obtain very low carbon levels at the steelmaking stage.
 Weldable grades were developed.
 Thermomechanical processing solved the problems of "roping" and "ridging" that led to inhomogenous deformation during deep drawing and to textured surfaces.
 End-user markets (such as that of domestic appliances) demanded less expensive grades with a more stable price at a time when there were large variations of the price of nickel. Ferritic stainless steel grades became attractive for some applications such as houseware.

Metallurgy 

To qualify as stainless steel, Fe-base alloys must contain at least 10.5%Cr.

The iron-chromium phase diagram shows that up to about 13%Cr, the steel undergoes successive  transformations upon cooling from the liquid phase from ferritic α  phase to austenitic γ phase and back to α. When some carbon is present, and if cooling occurs quickly, some of the austenite will transform into martensite. Tempering/annealing will transform the martensitic structure into ferrite and carbides.

Above about 17%Cr the steel will have a ferritic structure at all temperatures.

Above 25%Cr  the sigma phase may appear for relatively long times at temperature and induce room temperature embrittlement.

Chemical composition

Corrosion resistance 
The pitting corrosion resistance of stainless steels is estimated by the pitting resistance equivalent number (PREN).

PREN = %Cr + 3.3%Mo + 16%N

Where the Cr, Mo, and N, terms correspond to the contents by weight % of chromium, molybdenum and nitrogen respectively in the steel.

Nickel (Ni) has no role in the pitting corrosion resistance, so ferritic stainless steels can be as resistant to this form of corrosion as austenitic grades.

In addition, ferritic grades are very resistant to stress corrosion cracking (SCC).

Physical properties 

Ferritic stainless steels are magnetic. Some of their important physical, electrical, thermal and mechanical properties are given in the table here below.

Compared to austenitic stainless steels, they offer a better thermal conductivity, a plus for applications such as heat exchangers. 
The thermal expansion coefficient, close to that of carbon steel, facilitates the welding to carbon steels.

Mechanical properties

Applications 
 Lower-cost of recent-production kitchenware
 White goods
 Solar heaters
 Slate hooks
 Coins

References

Stainless steel